Dušan Pašek (18 January 1985 – 5 November 2021) was a Slovak professional ice hockey player who played HC Slovan Bratislava in the Slovak Extraliga.

On the morning of 5 November 2021, Pašek was discovered hanged in Koliba, Bratislava, during his time as a club official for Bratislava Capitals. His suicide at age 36 came only two days after the death of fellow club player Boris Sádecký. Pašek's father, Dušan, also committed suicide, at the age of 37, in 1998.

References

External links
 

1985 births
2021 deaths
2021 suicides
HC '05 Banská Bystrica players
SHK Hodonín players
HC Košice players
ŠHK 37 Piešťany players
HK 91 Senica players
HK 36 Skalica players
HC Slovan Bratislava players
Slovak ice hockey forwards
Ice hockey people from Bratislava
HK Trnava players
Suicides in Slovakia
Suicides by hanging